Michael "Mickey" McGee is a former Gaelic footballer who played for the Loughmacrory club and the Tyrone county team.

Awards
McGee has three All-Ireland Senior Football Championship winners' medals. He brought the first All-Ireland senior championship medal to his club, Loughmacrory, in 2003, the year Tyrone made the breakthrough at county senior level, and he won an All-Ireland minor medal with the county in 1998. From there he progressed to the Under-21 grade where he won two All-Ireland Under-21 championships in 2000 and 2001.
 
He helped Tyrone regain the Sam Maguire Cup in 2005.

McGee's 2007 and 2008 seasons were hampered by a shoulder injury, one of Tyrone's many long-term injuries.

References

Year of birth missing (living people)
Living people
Tyrone inter-county Gaelic footballers
Winners of one All-Ireland medal (Gaelic football)